Bokassa is a Norwegian rock band from Trondheim. Currently, the band consists of Jørn Kaarstad, Olav Dowkes and Bård Linga. The band has released three studio albums: Divide & Conquer (2017) on All Good Clean Records, Crimson Riders (2019) on Mvka Music and Molotov Rocktail (2021) on Napalm Records. The band toured Europe supporting Metallica on the WorldWired Tour in 2019, with Metallica drummer Lars Ulrich giving the band a glowing endorsement.

Discography 
Source:
 Divide & Conquer (2017, All Good Clean)
 Crimson Riders (2019, Mvka Music)
 Molotov Rocktail (2021, Napalm Records)

References

External links

Musical groups from Trondheim
Norwegian punk rock groups
Norwegian rock music groups